Guy Paxton Curtright (October 18, 1912 – August 23, 1997) was a left fielder in Major League Baseball who played for the Chicago White Sox (1943–1946).

A rookie at age 30, it was a long way for Curtright, who spent 11 seasons in the minors before make his way to major league with the Chicago White Sox. As a rookie in 1943, his only season as a regular, he hit .291 (6th in the American League) and posted career-highs in runs (67), hits (142), doubles (20), runs batted in (48), stolen bases (13) and games played (138), including a 26-game hitting streak.

In his four-season MLB career, Curtright was a .276 hitter with nine home runs and 108 RBI in 331 games.

Curtright died in Sun City Center, Florida, at the age of 84.

External links
Baseball Almanac
Baseball Library
Retrosheet

1912 births
1997 deaths
Baseball players from Missouri
Charleston Senators players
Chicago White Sox players
Henderson Oilers players
Major League Baseball left fielders
Muskogee Tigers players
People from Monroe County, Missouri
St. Paul Saints (AA) players
Shreveport Sports players
Sioux City Cowboys players
Truman Bulldogs baseball players